The 1899–1900 British Home Championship was an edition of the annual football tournament played between the British Home Nations. Conducted in the second half of the 1899–1900 season, it was dominated by Scotland who achieved a whitewash of their opponents by winning all three games. Wales and England shared second place, with Ireland bringing up the rear.

Wales and Ireland began the competition in Llandudno, the Welsh side winning 2–0 to take immediate advantage. Ireland then returned to Belfast to play Scotland, where they again lost, conceding three without reply. In Cardiff, Wales and England played out a draw giving both a chance of success in the tournament before Wales' hopes were ended by a heavy 5–2 defeat by Scotland in Aberdeen. England however remained strong, beating the Irish and needing a draw to share the trophy with Scotland and a win to take it undisputed. Scotland however were much too strong, dominating the match and winning 4–1 to complete three victories and win the competition.

Table

Results

Winning squad

References

1900 in British sport
1900
1899–1900 in Scottish football
1899–1900 in English football
Brit
1899–1900 in Welsh football